Where You Are may refer to:

 Where You Are (album), by Socialburn, 2003
 "Where You Are" (CNBLUE song), 2012
 "Where You Are" (Jessica Simpson song), 2000
 "Where You Are" (Rahsaan Patterson song), 1997
 "Where You Are", a song by 50 Cent from the 2009 album Forever King
 "Where You Are", a 1928 song by Alice Faye
 "Where You Are", a 2010 song by Cali Swag District
 "Where You Are", a song by Jay Sean from the 2013 album Neon
 "Where You Are", a song from the 2016 soundtrack Moana
 "Where You Are", a 2022 song by PinkPantheress featuring Willow Smith
 "Where You Are", a song by Whitney Houston from the 1987 album Whitney

See also 
 Where Are You (disambiguation)